The PWA Heavyweight Championship is a professional wrestling heavyweight championship in Pro Wrestling America (PWA). It is the only remaining championship after PWA began running occasional events in the mid-1990s.

The inaugural champion was Mad Dog Vachon, who defeated "Mr. Electricity" Steve Regal in Anoka, Minnesota on January 15, 1985 to become the first PWA Heavyweight Champion. Charlie Norris holds the record for most reigns, with five. At 554 days, Ricky Rice's first reign is the longest in the title's history. Erik Lockhart's only title reign is the shortest, at less than a day. Overall, there have been 26 reigns shared between 15 wrestlers with two vacancies.

Title history
Key

Reigns

List of combined reigns

Footnotes

References
General

Specific

Heavyweight wrestling championships